Little Murray River, a perennial stream of the Clarence River catchment, is located in the Northern Tablelands district of New South Wales, Australia.

Course and features
Little Murray River rises at Little Murray Trigonometrical Station, on the slopes of the Great Dividing Range, within Bellinger River National Park. The river flows generally northeast and north, joined by one minor tributary, before reaching its confluence with the Nymboida River, east of Bostobrick. The river descends  over its  course.

See also

 Rivers of New South Wales

References

 

Rivers of New South Wales
Northern Tablelands